Circobotys flaviciliata is a moth in the family Crambidae. It was described by George Hampson in 1910. It is found in the Democratic Republic of the Congo.

References

Moths described in 1910
Pyraustinae